PCAP-over-IP is a method for transmitting captured network traffic through a TCP connection. The captured network traffic is transferred over TCP as a PCAP file in order to preserve relevant metadata about the packets, such as timestamps.

Background and etymology 
The first known use of the term PCAP-over-IP is by Packet Forensics in 2011. However, the concept behind PCAP-over-IP was mentioned already in 2008 as part of a feature request for Wireshark. The need for this feature was motivated as follows:

"This feature is useful when the capture is generated on a machine which does not have much storage (e.g. embedded system). E.g., ipmb_traced application available on Pigeon Point shelf managers can transmit the capture over the TCP connection without writing it to the filesystem."

Use cases 
Common use cases for PCAP-over-IP include:
 Transmitting captured network traffic in real time to a remote machine
 Transferring network traffic between two applications on the same host
 Providing decrypted traffic from a TLS interception proxy to a packet analyzer or IDS.

Software with PCAP-over-IP support 
 Arkime
 NetworkMiner
 PolarProxy
 Wireshark
 Xplico

Workarounds 
Software that can sniff network traffic, but doesn't support PCAP-over-IP, can read packets from a PCAP-over-IP provider with help of a netcat and tcpreplay combo.
nc [SERVER] 57012 | tcpreplay -i eth0 -t -

References 

Computer network analysis